The 2023 Louisiana House of Representatives election is scheduled to be held on October 14, 2023, with runoff elections on November 18, 2023. All 105 seats in the Louisiana House of Representatives are up for election to four-year terms. It will be held concurrently with elections for all statewide offices and the Louisiana State Senate.

Under Louisiana's jungle primary system, all candidates will appear on the same ballot, regardless of party, and voters may vote for any candidate, regardless of their party affiliation.

Background 
In the 2019 state legislature elections, Republicans expanded their majorities in both chambers to 68 in the House and 27 in the Senate. They currently have a two-thirds majority of 70 members in the House, after elected Democrats Malinda White and Francis C. Thompson switched parties.

The 2023 election will be the first election held under new district maps following redistricting as a result of the 2020 Census.

Overview

Special elections
One special election was held on February 18, 2023, with a runoff on March 25, 2023, to fill a vacancy in District 93.
Incumbent Democrat Royce Duplessis resigned on December 6, 2022, to join the State Senate. Both candidates advancing to the runoff are likewise members of the Democratic Party.

See also 
 2023 United States state legislative elections
 2023 Louisiana State Senate election

References 

Louisiana House of Representatives
House of Representatives